Agustín Fernández (16 April 1928  - 2 June 2006) was a Cuban painter, sculptor, and multimedia artist. Although he was born in Cuba, he spent the majority of his career outside of Cuba, and produced art in Havana, Paris, San Juan, and New York.

Fernández is considered to be a member of the surrealist school. At the age of 11, Fernández began taking art lessons with Justicia de Leon, and, at the age of 20, Fernández enrolled in the Academia Nacional de Bellas Artes San Alejandro in Havana. In the years that followed, Fernández worked in Cuba until he moved to Spain in 1953. In Spain, he audited courses at Real Academia de Bellas Artes de San Fernando and enjoyed his first solo exhibition at Galería Buchholz in Madrid. In 1960, Fernandez moved to Paris, where he would live until he moved to San Juan, in 1968. In 1972, Fernández finally settled in New York, where he would work for the remainder of his life.

Recent Major exhibitions 
2013 - "Form’s Transgressions: The Drawings of Agustín Fernández," The Snite Museum of Art

2014 - "Agustín Fernández: Ultimate Surrealist," American University Museum at the Katzen Arts Center, Washington, DC

2018 - "Paradoxe de la Jouissance,"  Mairie du 4e arrondissement, Paris, France

2019 - "Agustín Fernández: Armaduras," Institute of Contemporary Art, Miami, Florida

Collections 

 Art Museum of the Americas
 Brooklyn Museum of Art
 Cabinet des Estampes
 Cintas Foundation
 Círculo de Bellas Artes
 El Museo del Barrio
 Godwin-Ternbach Museum
 Jack S. Blanton Museum of Art
 JP Morgan Chase Collection
 Lowe Art Museum
 Miami-Dade Public Library
 Museo de Arte Moderno La Tertulia
 Museo de Arte de Ponce, Ponce
 Museo Nacional de Bellas Artes
 Museum of Art,  Nova Southern University
 Museum of Latin American Art
 Museum of Modern Art
 Newark Museum
 New Mexico Museum of Art
 New York Public Library
 Snite Museum of Art
 Saint Thomas University Library
 The Frost Art Museum
 The Patrick Lannan Foundation
 Tucson Museum of Art
 University of Texas-Pan American
 Utah Museum of Fine Arts
 Victoria and Albert Museum
 Worcester Art Museum
 Yale University Art Gallery

References 

1928 births
2006 deaths
Surrealist artists
Artists from Havana
Cuban surrealist artists
Cuban painters
Cuban exiles
Cuban sculptors
Cuban expatriates in Spain
Cuban expatriates in France
Cuban expatriates in the United States
Academia Nacional de Bellas Artes San Alejandro alumni